Australia is a high income country, and this is reflected in the good status of health of the population overall. In 2011, Australia ranked 2nd on the United Nations Development Programme’s Human Development Index, indicating the level of development of a country. Despite the overall good status of health, the disparities occurring in the Australian healthcare system are a problem.  The poor and those living in remote areas as well as indigenous people are, in general, less healthy than others in the population, and programs have been implemented to decrease this gap. These include increased outreach to the indigenous communities and government subsidies to provide services for people in remote or rural areas.

Life expectancy

Life expectancy in Australia is among the highest in the world. According to the 2013 Global Burden of Disease Study Australia was ranked third highest in life expectancy. The life expectancy (at birth) in 2015 was estimated to be 79.7 years for males and 84.74 years for females. In 2018 the average number of years a newborn Australian child would live if current mortality patterns were to stay the same was 82.9 years, this has increased from 69.3 years since 1950. In 2015, the crude birth rate was 13.3 per 1,000 people, while the total fertility rate in 2018 was 1.83. The crude death rate in 2018 was 6.7 per 1,000 people. The infant mortality rate was 3 per 1,000 live births.  In 2002/2004, less than 2.5% of the population was undernourished.

Life Expectancy in Australia is above the global average of 72 years as of 2016.

Under 5 mortality rate (U5MR) 
Since 1950, Australia’s U5MR has dropped from 31.6 deaths per 1000 live births to 8.85 deaths in 1990 to 3.4 currently in 2018. The global U5MR was 93 deaths in 1990 and was recorded at 40.8 in 2016.

Disability adjusted life years 

The top ranked causes of disability-adjusted life years (DALYs) lost for Australian citizens as of 2016 for all ages and sexes were:
 neoplasms3,751 DALYs per 100,000 population
 mental disorders3,216 DALYs per 100,000
 musculoskeletal disorders2,956 DALYs per 100,000
 cardiovascular diseases2,895 DALYs per 100,000

Since 2013 Australia's total DALYs has been slightly increasing each year.

Causes of death

The leading causes of death in Australia in 2011 were ischaemic heart disease, cerebrovascular disease, dementia and alzheimer disease, trachea, bronchus and lung cancers and chronic obstructive pulmonary disease.  More than half of all consultations with GPs in Australia are in relation to chronic condition such as heart disease, cancer or diabetes.

The fastest growing chronic illness in Australia is diabetes. There are approximately 100,000 new diagnoses every year.  On average one Australian is diagnosed with type 2 diabetes every five minutes.

There was an 80% increase in cyclist deaths on Australian roads between 2017 and 2018. 45 people died.

The Top leading causes of death according to the Institute for Health Metrics and Evaluation (IHME) as of 2016 in Australia were 1st Cardiovascular Disease (accounting for 219.03 deaths per 100,000 population), 2nd Neoplasms (accounting for 201.65 deaths per 100,000 population), 3rd Neurological Disorders (accounting for 76.18 deaths per 100,000 population). In the Western Pacific Region in which Australia lies within, the leading causes of death are 1st Cardiovascular Disease (Accounting for 274.55 deaths per 100,000 population), 2nd Neoplasms (accounting for 172.8 deaths per 100,000 population) and 3rd Chronic Respiratory Disease (59.25 deaths per 100,000 population).

Women's health 
In 2011, endometriosis was estimated to affect 550,000 women and girls in Australia, with estimated direct costs of $6 billion per annum for medical and surgical treatments of adult women and $600 million per annum for medical and surgical treatments of girls. Between the ages of 15 to 49 years, approximately 1 in 10 women are affected by it, a higher incidence than conditions such as breast cancer, prostate cancer, diabetes and AIDS combined within that age range. Working women are estimated to lose 11 hours per week due to absenteeism and presenteeism. In addition, there are the indirect costs and the general loss of quality of life due to the debilitating pain. Such indirect costs include welfare payments for disability and unemployment, expenditure on complementary medication and therapies, and the medical costs of treating consequential issues of mental health and infertility caused by endometriosis. Endometriosis usually first presents symptoms during adolescence but there is an average of 8 years from first symptoms to diagnosis, due to parents and general practitioners "discrediting" the pelvic pain as being a "normal" aspect of the menstrual cycle, while employed women encounter negativity by employers towards women perceived to have menstrual irregularities.

In July 2018, Australian Health Minister Greg Hunt launched a National Action Plan for Endometriosis, which calls for:
 increased education and awareness about endometriosis among sufferers, health professionals and the public
 improved access to diagnostic and treatment services using evidence-based clinical guidelines and an accreditation system for clinicians
 further research into the causes, diagnosis and treatment of endometriosis

Health status
According to the Australian Institute of Health and Welfare, "The health status of a country incorporates a number of different measures to indicate the overall level of health. It is more than merely the presence or absence of disease; it includes measures of physical illness, levels of functioning and mental wellbeing."

A 2007 study found that the 11 largest preventable contributions to the indigenous burden of disease in Australia were tobacco, alcohol, illicit drugs, high body mass, inadequate physical activity, low intake of fruit and vegetables, high blood pressure, high cholesterol, unsafe sex, child sexual abuse and intimate partner violence. The 26% of Indigenous Australians living in remote areas experience 40% of the health gap of Indigenous Australians overall.

Preventable diseases
Cigarette smoking is the largest preventable cause of death and disease in Australia but the proportion of the population who smoke, 16%, is amongst the lowest in the world. It was 34% in 1983.  See :Category:Smoking in Australia.

Chronic non-communicable diseases account for a higher proportion of deaths than infectious diseases in Australia. Australia has the fifth highest rate of obesity in the OECD.  More than a third of the adult population are overweight and about a third obese. 57% do not take enough exercise.

Australian health statistics show that chronic disease such as heart disease, particularly strokes which reflects a more affluent lifestyle is a common cause of death. Australians the majority of whom are fair skinned are prone to skin cancer because of exposure to UV light from sunlight with 80% of all cancers diagnosed being of the skin, unlike in Canada or US where skin cancer is 2-3 times less common because of less intense sunlight.

Other issues include compensation for victims of asbestos exposure related disease, lead exposure due to inhalation of lead based paints and the slow development of HealthConnect. The provision of adequate mental health services and the quality of aged care, are other problems in some parts of the country.

In Australia, vaccinations are available for vaccine preventable diseases. This is part of the National Immunisation Program Schedule.

Vaccination
In an effort to boost vaccination rates in Australia, the Australian government decided that starting on 1 January 2016, certain benefits (such as the universal 'Family Allowance' welfare payments for parents of children) will no longer be available for conscientious objectors of vaccination; those with medical grounds for not vaccinating will continue to receive such benefits. The policy is supported by a majority of Australian parents as well as the Australian Medical Association (AMA) and Early Childhood Australia. In 2014, about 97 percent of children under 7 years have been vaccinated, though the number of conscientious objectors to vaccination has increased by 24,000 to 39,000 over the past decade.

The government began the Immunise Australia Program to increase national immunisation rates.  They fund a number of different vaccinations for certain groups of people. The intent is to encourage the most at-risk populations to get vaccinated.  The government maintains an immunization schedule.

Initiatives
 DisabilityCare Australia
 National Physical Activity Guidelines
 National Alcohol Strategy 2006–2009
 Healthdirect Australia – a government-funded service that provides access to health information, and listings of health services
 Women's Healthy Ageing Project – the longest ongoing study of women’s health in Australia (est. 1990)

See also
 COVID-19 pandemic in Australia
 Health care in Australia
 Immigrant health in Australia
 Indigenous health in Australia
 Child nutrition in Australia
 Concussions in Australian sport
 Cosmetic surgery in Australia
 Suicide in Australia
 Obesity in Australia
Major health campaigns and programmes
 Harry Wyatt Wunderly, instrumental in the management and reduction of tuberculosis
 Slip-Slop-Slap, a skin cancer prevention campaign
 SunSmart, a skin cancer prevention campaign
Physical fitness campaigns and programmes
 Life. Be in it.
 Go for Your Life

References